was widely described as a cultural icon for the deaf and hard of hearing in Japan.  She overcame many barriers to deafness in her home country to the benefit of thousands of deaf people in Japan.  It is in large part due to her efforts that the Japanese people are more appreciative of deaf culture.

A talented performer, with a love for song, Mariko is a friend to many deaf people internationally, including the Wild Zappers, among others.  She introduced many deaf artists to Japan as the promoter.

Originally trained as a nutritionist, she entered the California State University at Northridge at the age of 25.  After graduation, she returned to Japan to work at an English-language newspaper.

Her publications in Japanese included American Sign Language Broadened My World and Learning Sign Language in America.  She provided Japanese translations of Heather Whitestone's biography Yes You Can, Heather! and Ben Bahan's book Signs for Me.

She died of cancer in 2006.

References

1958 births
2006 deaths
California State University, Northridge alumni
Deaf musicians
Japanese deaf people
20th-century Japanese women singers
20th-century Japanese singers